Rugrats is an American animated television series created by Arlene Klasky, Gábor Csupó, and Paul Germain. The show focuses on a group of toddlers, most prominently Tommy, Chuckie, Angelica, twins Phil and Lil, Susie, then later Dil and Kimi and their day-to-day lives, usually involving common life experiences that become adventures in the babies' imaginations. Adults in the series are almost always unaware of what the children are up to.

The series premiered on August 11, 1991 as the second Nicktoon after Doug and preceding The Ren & Stimpy Show. Production initially halted in 1993 after 65 episodes, with the last episode airing on November 12, 1994. In 1995 and 1996, two Jewish-themed specials premiered; "A Rugrats Passover" and "A Rugrats Chanukah", respectively, both of which received critical acclaim. During this time, well after the end of the show's production run, Rugrats began to receive a boost in ratings and popularity with constant reruns on Nickelodeon. In 1996, Klasky Csupo Animation began producing new episodes, and the show's fourth season began airing in 1997. As a result of the show's popularity, a series of theatrical films were released. The final episode aired on August 1, 2004, bringing the series to a total of 172 episodes and 9 seasons during a 13-year run.

On July 21, 2001, Nickelodeon broadcast the made-for-TV special "All Growed Up" in celebration of the series' 10th anniversary. Though initially intended as a one-time special, it was popular enough that it acted as a pilot for the Rugrats spin-off series All Grown Up!, which chronicles the lives of the babies and their parents after they age 10 years. Another spin-off series, Rugrats Pre-School Daze, was considered, with four episodes produced. Two direct-to-video specials were released in 2005 and 2006, under the title Rugrats Tales from the Crib. Tie-in media for the series include video games, comics, toys, and various other merchandise.

Rugrats gained over 20 awards during its 13-year run, including 4 Daytime Emmy Awards, 6 Kids' Choice Awards, and its own star on the Hollywood Walk of Fame. The series garnered Nickelodeon high ratings and was the network's top-rated show between 1995 and 2000. It was Nickelodeon's longest-running Nicktoon until 2012 when SpongeBob SquarePants aired its 173rd episode.

On July 16, 2018, it was announced that Nickelodeon had given a series order to a 26-episode revival of the series, executive produced by Klasky, Csupo, and Germain.

Series overview

Episodes

Pilot (1990)

Season 1 (1991)

Season 2 (1992–93)

(HH) indicates the amount of households an episode was viewed in when it premiered.

Season 3 (1993–95)

Season 4 (1996–97)

Season 5 (1998–99)

Season 6 (1999–2001)
In the United States, episodes 127 to 130 were held over from this season and ended up airing during Season 7. The first Klasky Csupo logo still appeared after the second logo appeared at the end of The Rugrats Movie. The second logo did not appear until "Runaway Reptar".

Season 7 (2001; 2004)
During season 7, Rugrats made a change with a different format that consisted of three segments per episode. Additionally, all half-hour stories from this point on had two ad breaks instead of one.

Season 8 (2001–03)
The original two-segment format for Rugrats was brought back in season 8. However, the half-hour episodes retain having two commercial breaks. The first Klasky Csupo logo appeared after the credits in the early airings of this season. However, the Season 8 DVD from Amazon.com, "The '90s Are All That" and the later airings kept the second logo.

Season 9 (2002–04)

Home video releases
Nickelodeon and Amazon.com produce DVDs of new and old Nickelodeon shows through the CreateSpace service. Using a concept similar to print on demand, Amazon manufactures the discs, cover art, and disc art. , Seasons 1–9 were available. , the Amazon.com releases have been discontinued.

In Australia, Beyond Home Entertainment has released all 9 seasons on DVD.

In May 2017, Nickelodeon and Paramount Home Media Distribution released Seasons 1 and 2 on DVD. In February 2018, Nickelodeon and Paramount Home Media Distribution released Seasons 3 and 4 on DVD. On May 18, 2021, Nickelodeon and Paramount Home Media Distribution released Rugrats: The Complete Series on DVD.

Rugrats: Tales from the Crib (2005–06)
These movies are direct-to-DVD movies that are part of the Rugrats series.

Films

Notes

References

General references

External links
 TV Guide's Rugrats episode

Lists of Nickelodeon television series episodes
Lists of American children's animated television series episodes
Rugrats (franchise)